"Simple Life" is a song written by English musician Elton John and songwriter Bernie Taupin, released in 1993 as the final single from John's 1992 album, The One. The song was John's thirteenth number one on the Billboard Adult Contemporary chart, spending three weeks at the number-one spot, and reached number thirty on the Billboard Hot 100. It also peaked at number three on Canada's RPM Top Singles chart and topped the RPM Adult Contemporary chart for three weeks. This song's appearance in the US top 40 set a record, as John had achieved a top-forty hit for 24 consecutive years, breaking the old record of 23 years set by Elvis Presley in 1977.

John regularly performed "Simple Life" at his concerts from 1992 to 1998. He often paired the song with "The One."

Critical reception
Pan-European magazine Music & Media commented in their review of "Simple Life", "How does he manage it, to come up with a strong song time after time? The "Once Upon A Time"-like wailing harmonica almost cuts out your heart. All proceeds will go to various charities."

Music video
The accompanying music video for "Simple Life" was directed by Australian film director Russell Mulcahy. It features Elton singing from inside a cube in the middle of a stadium, which slowly rotates and shows people dancing around the cube.

Formats and pressings
The single version of "Simple Life" has a faster tempo, more defined drumbeat, more harmonica, less synthesised bass, and over ninety seconds shorter. It also omits the chorus after the second verse. 
 UK 7-inch single
 "Simple Life" (edit)
 "The Last Song"

 US 7-inch and cassette single
 "Simple Life" (hot mix) – 4:59
 "The North" – 5:14

Charts

Weekly charts

Year-end charts

Release history

References

External links
 Elton John - Simple Life on YouTube

1992 songs
1993 singles
Elton John songs
MCA Records singles
Music videos directed by Russell Mulcahy
The Rocket Record Company singles
Song recordings produced by Chris Thomas (record producer)
Songs with lyrics by Bernie Taupin
Songs with music by Elton John